Fernando Sucre, played by Amaury Nolasco, is a fictional character from the American television series, Prison Break. He is introduced to the series in the pilot episode as the prison cellmate of the series protagonist, Michael Scofield (played by Wentworth Miller) quickly growing into a major character in the series.

Background
Of Puerto Rican descent, Sucre grew up in Chicago where he had several run-ins with the law. However, he later finds a steady job at a warehouse and his girlfriend, Maricruz Delgado. He ends up in prison after he attempts to rob a liquor store. In the flashback episode, "Brother's Keeper", it is revealed that the reason Sucre had held up the store was to get enough money to pay for an engagement ring for Maricruz. His cousin Hector then tips him off to the cops, as he was also infatuated with Maricruz. After his incarceration, Sucre has conjugal visits from Maricruz, but is occasionally worried about her seeming indecision about her future with him, as she is contemplating dating Hector.

Appearances
Fernando Sucre was first introduced as a main character in the series premiere. He appeared in every episode except ten: "First Down", "Unearthed", "John Doe", "Chicago", "Orientación", "The Sunshine State", "The Mother Lode", "VS.", "S.O.B." and "Cowboys & Indians".

Season 2

After parting ways with his fellow escapees, Sucre focuses his attention on reuniting with Maricruz. He learns that Hector and Maricruz are getting married in Las Vegas and attempts to stop the wedding but fails when he is again betrayed by Hector, who calls the police, forcing Sucre to flee. Following this disappointment, Sucre decides to find the Westmoreland's hidden money in Utah, and eventually reunites with the other escapees. When the money is found and packed, Sucre holds the others at gunpoint, forcing them to hand over the money. In "Dead Fall", it is revealed this was a ruse planned by Sucre and Michael, but they have been fooled by T-Bag, who switched the money bag for a bag of magazines. As they run from the police, Sucre falls into a river and is pinned by a fallen tree. Michael refuses to abandon Sucre and eventually saves his life, which Sucre repays when he saves Michael from the coyote in "Bolshoi Booze", arriving at the meet to reunite with the brothers and flee to Mexico. Because the brothers decide to stay and solve the conspiracy, Sucre gets on the escape plane alone, having made plans to meet Maricruz, who left Hector at the altar in Vegas.

After being forced to eject from the plane, Sucre lands in the Mexican desert and struggles to reach Maricruz at the Ixtapa airport, just in time to flee from airport security.  They arrive safely at Sucre's aunt's home in "Wash", but Sucre is soon captured by Bellick. Sucre offers Bellick a deal to lead him to T-Bag and the five million dollars, which Sucre has surmised is in the airport. While heading to Panama to look for T-Bag, Bellick tells Sucre that he has left Maricruz in a hole to die, and if she is to live Sucre must lead him to the money. Michael joins their hunt in the next episode, wanting to turn T-Bag in. Unfortunately, Bellick is shot in the leg by T-Bag and arrested. Michael and Sucre corner T-Bag with the intention of turning him in, but T-Bag stabs Sucre in the chest and flees. Sucre receives treatment for this injury but leaves the hospital AMA, to find Maricruz, whom he believes has been trapped by Bellick somewhere back in Mexico. He chases after Bellick, but collapses and blacks out, just as he finds Bellick. His fate is left open at the end of the season.

Season 3
By the beginning of the third season, Sucre remained the only member of the Fox River Eight to be still at large. The second episode of the third season Fire/Water shows Sucre to be alive and he is seen purchasing a gun at a local store. He proceeds to  confront Bellick at Sona prison and threatens to shoot him if he doesn't tell him where Maricruz is. He reveals he never really had her and that he chased her off by threatening to arrest them for accessory. Sucre eventually finds out that Maricruz is in Chicago and calls her and tearfully tells her that he must stay in Panama until he gets his life back together. In Call Waiting, Sucre asks Lincoln to split the money of Westmoreland. But Lincoln rebukes Sucre, saying they lost the money, and chases him away. Sucre later reappears, this time unconscious with a bottle of alcohol in the front steps of Lincoln's hotel room, after which Lincoln takes Sucre in. At first, Sucre is eager to move down to Colombia as a migrant worker to financially support Maricruz and his unborn child, and refuses to act as an interpreter to aid Lincoln in setting up Michael's escape plan.

Upon hearing of the murder of Sara Tancredi, Sucre changes his mind and commits to preparing a route for the escape from Sona by taking over as gravedigger to secretly damage the electric fence protecting the prison. Lechero's cousin Augusto soon approaches Sucre, to smuggle a package into Sona a single time. Sucre is swayed by the large amount of money offered. Afterwards Augusto asks him to make another delivery. After initially resisting Sucre ultimately agrees. Sucre soon commits himself fully to the escape plan in Photo Finish and Vamonos and almost helps Lincoln free his son L.J. Burrows. He and Lincoln later devise a plan to fool Company operative Gretchen Morgan that Sucre has turned against the brothers.

Later Sucre finds out the alias he chose to get a job at Sona has an arrest warrant, and is locked up in Sona shortly after Michael and Co. escape when T-Bag recognizes him and reveals his true identity. As a result, Sucre became the sixth and final member of the Fox River Eight (as C-Note was placed into witness protection and dropped of all charges, and Lincoln was exonerated) to be taken down by the authorities, and the third member not to die upon interception.

In the third season there is a conversation between Sucre and Gretchen Morgan about the meaning of his family name: Sucre in Catalan language means sugar. That's why she began to call him "azucar" (sugar in Spanish).

At the end of Season 3 Sucre was incarcerated into Sona for refusing to reveal to the guards the whereabouts of Michael Scofield subsequent to his escape. T-Bag convinced them that Sucre was involved, and after being tortured for several hours he was thrown into Sona, just in time to see T-Bag take over as the new ruler of the Panamanian prison after the death of its former ruler, Lechero.

Season 4
At the beginning of season four, Theodore Bagwell (T-Bag) burns Sona to the ground, and Sucre, with the aid of Brad Bellick, former CO of Fox River, escapes Sona to continue their life on the run. After fleeing and making it back to the United States, Sucre and Bellick are arrested and brought into police custody, where homeland security agent Don Self arranges to have Sucre and Bellick join an "off the books" government mission to retrieve "Scylla", the infamous Company's "little black book" in exchange for their freedoms. The team works together to find all of the missing cards and retrieves Scylla, only to have been double-crossed by Self and set up for murder so Self could get away with and sell Scylla. The team then proceeds to try to retrieve Scylla from Self but fails, resulting in Michael being kidnapped by the Company. Eventually, Sucre, in a discussion with Lincoln Burrows (brother of Michael), decides he has had enough of putting his life at risk to bring down the Company and leaves the group to return to his wife Maricruz and his newborn child.

Sucre later rejoins Michael (along with C-Note) to ambush the General after Michael is caught by the General and the Company. As Michael hands SCYLLA to Kellerman, the Gang is now fully exonerated. Sucre plays a part in The Final Break where he is tasked to wire the money from Sarah's assassination (failed) to T-Bag so that T-Bag will set a fire alarm to help with Sarah's escape. Sucre arrives too late, unable to transfer the money which he later gives to Sarah after Michael's “death”.

Season 5

Upon learning that Michael is alive, Sucre is eager to join Lincoln and C-Note to Yemen to rescue Michael. Lincoln gently rejects him, taking C-Note instead, who has a better knowledge of Yemen. 

However, after escaping from Yemen to Crete, Lincoln realizes they will not be able to get back to America by plane. As a result, he calls Sucre, who is now working on a cargo ship, and asks him to arrange for transport back to the States. Lincoln, Michael and Whip meet Sucre on the ship when it arrives, and he is overjoyed to see Michael alive, persuading the captain to bring them along. When reminiscing that night, he shows them he is selling inflatable dolls to clients all over the world, carried on the ship. When the Navy SEALS board the ship to arrest Michael, he tricks them, and manages to keep his friends out of harm, and forces the ship out of international waters so the government cannot arrest them. Michael's enemy, a CIA deep-cover operative code-named Poseidon orders a missile fired at the ship to kill Michael, but Michael's group, along with Sucre, escape in a raft.

In the next episode, they are saved by a fishing boat and taken to Marsailles, France. He and Whip, while getting food, later see a news broadcast that Kaniel Outis, Michael's supposed identity, is in France, and inform Michael and Lincoln. When Lincoln arranges with a former criminal employer for passage back to the States, Sucre is sent to New York, with Michael's phone, to throw off the pursuers. He sees the agents working for Poseidon find the phone on the plane, with no one, and smiles before leaving. He is not seen again, presumably returning to his family.

Characteristics 
In the flashback episode of the first season, "Brother's Keeper", Fernando's  first illegal act involved armed robbery with a revolver pointed right at the shopkeeper - only to take 100 dollars. He later repeated the act to earn the money for the engagement ring he intended to give to Maricruz, only to be turned in by his own cousin, Hector. During his time at Fox River Penitentiary he appeared to be in good terms with almost all correctional officers and other inmates prior to the prison break. He's easily one of only two members of the Fox River Eight whose loyalty towards Michael is unquestionable, (as seen in The Art of the Deal when at gunpoint, countless times, and while he made to dig up his own grave by the guards, he does not give up any info regarding the whereabouts of Michael) the other one being Lincoln Burrows. Fernando also has a knack for making unconventional and seemingly-mundane yet effective strategies from time to time, as seen when he managed to successfully cover up the hole that Scofield's PI crew dug up. Outside, he displayed being able to hot wire various vehicles in record time, which was a valuable asset for Michael and all the other cons that Scofield took with him on the night of the escape.

References 

Prison Break characters
Fictional characters from Chicago
Television sidekicks
Television characters introduced in 2005
Fictional prison escapees
Fictional Hispanic and Latino American people
Fictional criminals
Fictional prisoners and detainees in the United States